The Military Museum of Butte County collects, preserves, and displays the military history of California. The museum is located at 4514 Pacific Heights Road in Oroville, California.

Displays
The museum displays weapons, uniforms, supply wagons, acc. as well as includes exhibits, such as the one that describes a U.S. 7th Cavalry pursuit of Pancho Villa during the Mexican Revolution (early 1910s). Notably there is a 1917 Browning machine gun, as well as a World War I infantry uniform. World War II items include a 1940 M1 carbine, an English air raid siren, a 22mm Laudi antitank gun, a 1943 Swiss ammunition wagon, a British paratrooper cart, and a 1942 M16 halftrack. The Vietnam War era artifacts include a jungle penetrator used to rescue downed pilots.

References

Military and war museums in California
Museums in Butte County, California